Dona Lekha Shehani Handunkuttihettige (born 30 January 1993) is a Sri Lankan badminton player. She started to playing badminton at the age of 8. In 2009, she began to participate in the national badminton tournament, and in 2013, she won her first national title. She competed at the 2010 Summer Youth Olympics in Singapore. In 2014, she was the runner-up at the Uganda International tournament in the women's singles event. In 2016, she won the singles title at the Ivory Coast International, and in 2017, she won doubles title at the Ethiopia International in the women's singles and doubles event. Shehani was graduated from the Convent of Our Lady of Victories, Moratuwa.

Achievements

BWF International Challenge/Series (3 titles, 1 runner-up) 
Women's singles

Women's doubles

  BWF International Challenge tournament
  BWF International Series tournament
  BWF Future Series tournament

References

External links 
 
 
 
 

1993 births
Living people
Sri Lankan female badminton players
Badminton players at the 2010 Summer Youth Olympics
South Asian Games silver medalists for Sri Lanka
South Asian Games medalists in badminton